Rudolf Hoernes (7 October 1850 – 20 August 1912) was an Austrian geologist, born in Vienna, son of Moritz Hoernes.  He studied under Eduard Suess and became a Professor of geology in Graz. He was known for his earthquake studies in 1878 and proposed a classification of earthquakes into subsidence earthquakes, volcanic earthquakes and tectonic earthquakes. In 1893 he published a detailed textbook on earthquake theory (Erdbebenkunde) from a geological point of view.

External links
 
University of Vienna biography

1850 births
1912 deaths
Scientists from Vienna
19th-century Austrian geologists
20th-century Austrian geologists